Brachinus andalusiacus is a species of ground beetle in the Carabinae subfamily that can be found in Spain and Morocco.

References

Beetles described in 1837
Beetles of Asia
Beetles of Europe
Taxa named by Jules Pierre Rambur
Brachininae